The 1992–93 Taça de Portugal was the 54th edition of the Portuguese football knockout tournament, organized by the Portuguese Football Federation (FPF). The 1992–93 Taça de Portugal began in September 1992. The final was played on 10 June 1993 at the Estádio Nacional.

Boavista were the previous holders, having defeated Porto 2–1 in the previous season's final. Benfica defeated cup holders Boavista, 5–2 in the final. As a result of Benfica winning the domestic cup competition, the Encarnados faced 1992–93 Primeira Divisão winners Porto in the 1993 Supertaça Cândido de Oliveira.

Fourth round
All fourth round cup ties were played on the 29 November.

|}

Fifth round
Ties were played on the 27 December.

Sixth round
Ties were played in January. Due to the odd number of teams involved at this stage of the competition, Amora qualified for the quarter-finals due to having no opponent to face at this stage of the competition.

Quarter-finals
Ties were played on the 3 February.

Semi-finals
Ties were played between the 14 April and 6 May.

Final

References

Taça de Portugal seasons
Taca De Portugal, 1992-93
1992–93 domestic association football cups